Semniotes is a genus of moths belonging to the subfamily Olethreutinae of the family Tortricidae.

Species
Semniotes abrupta Diakonoff, 1973
Semniotes bellana Kuznetzov, 1988
Semniotes confinana Kuznetzov, 2003
Semniotes halantha (Meyrick, 1909)

See also
List of Tortricidae genera

References

External links
tortricidae.com

Tortricidae genera
Olethreutinae
Taxa named by Alexey Diakonoff